"This Is How It Feels" is a song by the Inspiral Carpets. Written by Clint Boon, it was their first single to enter the UK Top 40, where it peaked at #14.  It reached #149 on the Australian ARIA singles chart.

The song was later covered by Carter The Unstoppable Sex Machine on their 1992 – The Love Album, appearing on Disc 2 of the Deluxe edition, and the compilation album You Fat Bastard.

The song tells the story of a working class mother, involved in an extramarital affair, which resulted in her lover’s suicide. Meaning, she is unable reveal the reason for her grief, without also revealing the affair.

The second verse of this song was changed for the radio edit. The original lyrics for the first and third line were: "There's a funeral in the town" and "Seems they found him under a train" respectively. However, in the radio version, they are as follows: "Black car drives through the town" and "Left a note for a local girl." The edit was most likely made because the original version's lyrics were in reference to suicide.

Track list

7" 
 This Is How It Feels
 Tune for a Family

12"/CD 
 This Is How It Feels (extended)
 Tune for a Family
 This is How it Feels (radio edit)
 Seeds of Doubt

Cassette 
 This Is How It Feels (extended)
 Tune for a Family
 This is How it Feels (radio edit)
 Whiskey

References 

1990 singles
1990 songs
Inspiral Carpets songs
Mute Records singles
Songs about suicide
UK Independent Singles Chart number-one singles